Gilbert Laws may refer to:

Gilbert L. Laws (1838–1907), U.S. Representative from Nebraska
Gilbert Laws (sailor) (1870–1918), British Olympic sailor